Agios Antonios in Greek refers to Saint Anthony. It may also refer to a number of places named after him:

 Agios Antonios metro station, a station of the Athens Metro
 Agios Antonios, Thessaloniki, a village in the Thermi municipality, Greece
 Agios Antonios, Western Macedonia, a village in the Kastoria municipality, Greece
 Agios Antonios, Central Macedonia, village in the Kilkis municipality, Greece
 Ayios Antonios, Nicosia, a neighbourhood of Nicosia, Cyprus